
Gmina Lądek is a rural gmina (administrative district) in Słupca County, Greater Poland Voivodeship, in west-central Poland.

The gmina contains part of the protected area called Warta Landscape Park.

Villages
Gmina Lądek contains the villages and settlements of Ciążeń, Ciążeń-Holendry, Dąbrowa, Dolany, Dziedzice, Jaroszyn, Jaroszyn-Kolonia, Ląd, Ląd-Kolonia, Lądek, Nakielec, Piotrowo, Policko, Ratyń, Samarzewo, Sługocin, Sługocin-Kolonia, Wacławów and Wola Koszucka.

Neighbouring gminas
Gmina Lądek is bordered by the town of Słupca and by the gminas of Golina, Kołaczkowo, Pyzdry, Rzgów, Słupca and Zagórów.

References
Polish official population figures 2006

Ladek
Słupca County